Werner Zemp (1906-1959) was a German-Swiss poet and translator, "regarded in Switzerland as the most distinguished German-Swiss pastoral poet of his generation". Zemp was also an expert on the 19th-century poet Eduard Mörike.

Works
 Gedichte [Poetry], 1937.
 Mörike : Elemente und Anfänge [Mörike: elements and beginnings], 1938
 (tr.) Tanz, Zeichnung und Degas [Dance, drawing and Degas] by Paul Valéry. Zurich, 1940. Translated from the French Degas, danse, dessin.
 (ed.) Briefe [Letters] by Eduard Mörike.
 Das lyrische Werk, Aufsätze, Briefe [The lyrical work, essays, letters], 1967.

References

1906 births
1959 deaths
Swiss poets in German
20th-century Swiss poets
French–German translators
20th-century translators